Rameshwar Kumar Mahto is an Indian politician and member of the Bihar Legislative Council. In the elections on March 23, 11 candidates were elected unopposed.

Life and political career
Rameswar Mahto was born to Ramprakash Mahto at the Bhasar village in the Sitamarhi district of Bihar. He is the member of Bihar Legislative Council and has remained the organisational head of the Janata Dal (United). Mahto is a businessman besides being a politician and he has remained associated with the party for long. Besides being a participant in active politics of the state of Bihar, he also runs business of crockery and marbles. Mahto has served as the district head of JD(U) for Madhubani. He is also active in social services. He has pursued B.Com and before getting elected as Member of Legislative Council, he was also active for getting elected as Member of Legislative Assembly from Sitamarhi assembly constituency.

References

Living people
Politicians from Patna
Lok Sabha members from Bihar
Members of the Bihar Legislative Council
Janata Dal (United) politicians
1976 births